Conchylodes zebra is a moth in the family Crambidae. It was described by Sepp in 1850. It is found in Suriname and French Guiana.

References

Moths described in 1850
Spilomelinae